Tiffosi is a clothing brand that is part of the VNG Group, based in Portugal. The company was established in 1978. It specializes in jeans, being considered the most popular jeans brand in Portugal and Spain.

Stores and distribution 
As of 2015, the company had 70 stores in Portugal. It was also distributing its cloths to over 1 700 clients worldwide.

External links 
 Official website

References 

Retail companies of Portugal
Multinational companies headquartered in Portugal
Clothing companies of Portugal
Clothing brands
Jeans by brand
Portuguese companies established in 1978
Children's clothing brands